David Goodwin (born February 27, 1992) is an American ice hockey center playing for Belfast Giants in the UK EIHL. Goodwin previously played for Cracovia Krakow, IK Oskarshamn of the Swedish Hockey League and Mora IK. Goodwin also previously played for the Penn State Nittany Lions.

References

External links

1992 births
Living people
American men's ice hockey centers
Ice hockey people from St. Louis
Green Bay Gamblers players
Sioux City Musketeers players
Cedar Rapids RoughRiders players
Mora IK players
Belfast Giants players
MKS Cracovia (ice hockey) players
Penn State Nittany Lions men's ice hockey players
SaiPa players
American expatriate ice hockey players in Finland
American expatriate ice hockey players in Sweden
American expatriate ice hockey players in Northern Ireland
American expatriate ice hockey players in Poland